Maxine "Max" Drinkwater (R/R) (née Simmons; born May 19, 1936) is a former first basewoman and second basewoman for the South Bend Blue Sox of the All-American Girls Professional Baseball League. 

Spending her childhood in Camden, Maine, Simmons spent summers playing baseball with her brothers and other kids from the neighborhood, exhibiting a distinct aptitude for the game. In a 2005 interview, Simmons recalled: "I didn't have to learn how to play. I just knew.  We had a good group of neighborhood kids and I lived right near the field."

Followers of the AAGPBL best remember Max as the South Bend Blue Sox's first pick at the league's 1954 tryouts. In her sole season playing in the league, 18-year-old Simmons ranked as one of the league's top defensive second basewomen. Playing in 45 of the team's 111 games, Simmons boasted a .947 fielding percentage. However, she struggled offensively, batting only .147 with an OBP of .243. Her performance earned her a place in the National Baseball Hall of Fame and, in 2005, Maine's Baseball Hall of Fame. On being the first woman to be inducted, then 69-year-old Maxine reportedly said, "I think it's pretty good. It's been a long time coming."

Unfortunately, the league folded after the 1954 season, ending Simmons' professional baseball career. She currently resides in Camden, Maine.

Career statistics
Batting

Fielding

References

1936 births
American baseball players
All-American Girls Professional Baseball League players
South Bend Blue Sox players
Living people